Aptitude (foaled March 27, 1997) is an American Thoroughbred racehorse, winner of the 2001 Jockey Club Gold Cup.

Career

Aptitude's first race was on October 21, 1999, where he came in 6th place.

On January 1, 2000, he won his first race at Santa Anita Park.

He finished in 2nd place at both the 2000 Kentucky Derby and the 2000 Belmont Stakes.

On July 1, 2001, he won his first Grade 1 race,  the Hollywood Gold Cup. He followed that victory up with a win on August 19, 2001, at the Saratoga Breeders' Cup Handicap.

Aptitude won the biggest race of his career by winning the Grade 1 2001 Jockey Club Gold Cup. He raced one last time at the 2001 Breeders' Cup Classic, coming in 8th.

Stud career
Aptitudes's descendants include:

c = colt, f = filly

Pedigree

References

1997 racehorse births